Swallow This Live is the first live album by American glam metal band Poison. It was released in 1991 by Capitol Records. The album peaked at number 51 on the Billboard 200, number 42 on the Cash Box albums chart, and was certified Gold in 2001 by the RIAA.

Production and marketing
The album features sixteen live tracks from Poison's first three studio albums Look What the Cat Dragged In, Open Up and Say...Ahh!, and Flesh and Blood. These live tracks were recorded in Miami, Orlando, and Tampa during the Florida section of Poison’s Flesh and Blood world tour. Swallow This Live also contains four new studio tracks, which were the last recorded before guitarist C.C. DeVille departed from Poison later in 1991. One of these, "So Tell Me Why", was released as a single and reached number 25 in the United Kingdom in November 1991 and features a music video.

Track listing
Disc 1  
 "Intro" (1:20)
 "Look What the Cat Dragged In" (3:36)
 "Look But You Can't Touch" (4:05)
 "Let It Play" (4:31)
 "Good Love" (3:52)
 "Life Goes On" (6:12)
 "Ride the Wind" (4:11)
 "I Want Action" (4:58)
 "Drum Solo" (8:21)
 "Something to Believe In" (6:15)
 "Poor Boy Blues" (8:19)
 "Unskinny Bop" (3:57)

Disc 2    
 "Love on the Rocks" (4:27)
 "Guitar Solo" (11:03)
 "Every Rose Has Its Thorn" (4:27)
 "Fallen Angel" (4:48)
 "Your Mama Don't Dance" (3:12)
 "Nothin' But a Good Time" (7:43)
 "Talk Dirty to Me" (5:52)
 "So Tell Me Why [New studio track] (3:23)
 "Souls on Fire" [New studio track] (3:19)
 "Only Time Will Tell" [New studio track] (4:00)
 "No More Lookin' Back (Poison Jazz)" [New studio track] (3:19)

UK single-disc edition
The UK single disc version contained a cut down track listing that lost the guitar and drum solos and the tracks "Let It Play", "Life Goes On", "Ride the Wind", and "Love on the Rocks".

 "Intro"
 "Look What the Cat Dragged In"
 "Look But You Can't Touch"
 "Good Love"
 "I Want Action"
 "Something to Believe In"
 "Poor Boy Blues"
 "Unskinny Bop"
 "Every Rose Has Its Thorn"
 "Fallen Angel"
 "Your Mama Don't Dance"
 "Nothin' But a Good Time"
 "Talk Dirty to Me"
 "So Tell Me Why" [New Studio Track]
 "Souls on Fire" [New Studio Track]
 "Only Time Will Tell" [New Studio Track]
 "No More Lookin' Back (Poison Jazz)" [New Studio Track]

2004 remastered single-disc edition
Capitol Records released a digitally remastered edition of Swallow This Live in a single-disc format on June 1, 2004. Aside from the bonus studio tracks, this release is missing "Poor Boy Blues," the drum solo, and the guitar solo (although part of the guitar solo was included in the first  minutes of "Every Rose Has Its Thorn"; the main song starts at 4:47). In addition, much of the profanity from the original release has been edited out and the track listing was slightly altered to have "Thorn" as the last song on the disc.

 "Intro"
 "Look What the Cat Dragged In"
 "Look But You Can't Touch"
 "Let It Play"
 "Good Love"
 "Life Goes On"
 "Ride the Wind"
 "I Want Action"
 "Unskinny Bop"
 "Something to Believe In"
 "Love on the Rocks"
 "Fallen Angel"
 "Your Momma Don't Dance"
 "Nothin' But a Good Time"
 "Talk Dirty to Me"
 "Every Rose Has Its Thorn"

Video
Swallow This Live: Flesh & Blood World Tour is a Poison concert video, recorded in southern California in 1991. It was the first concert from the band to be released on VHS video.

 Look What The Cat Dragged In
 I Want Action
 Ride The Wind
 Life Goes On
 Let It Play
 Rikki's Solo
 Something To Believe In
 Good Love
 Poor Boy Blues
 Unskinny Bop
 Love On The Rocks
 C.C.'s Solo
 Every Rose Has Its Thorn
 Fallen Angel
 Your Mama Don't Dance
 Nothin' But A Good Time
 Talk Dirty To Me

Band members
 Bret Michaels – lead vocals, rhythm guitar
 C.C. DeVille – lead guitar, backing vocals
 Bobby Dall – bass, backing vocals
 Rikki Rockett – drums, backing vocals

Charts

Certifications

References

External links
Official website

Poison (American band) live albums
1991 live albums